Cło  is a village in the administrative district of Gmina Kazimierza Wielka, within Kazimierza County, Świętokrzyskie Voivodeship, Poland. It lies approximately six kilometres (four miles) south-east of Kazimierza Wielka and 71 kilometres (forty four miles) south of the regional capital, Kielce.

References

Villages in Kazimierza County